Volume III: The Silence of Animals is the third album by the Canadian indie rock band Two-Minute Miracles. It was released in 2003 on Teenage USA Recordings.

Track listing
All songs were written by Two-Minute Miracles.
 "Open the Front Door"
 "I'm Getting a Feel"
 "Aphasia"
 "Half an Average Song"
 "Stall Tactics"
 "The Silence of Animals"
 "Theme from Volume III"
 "Another Quicksand Voice"
 "Warm Air vs. Cold"
 "Crumb"
 "Running Out of Freon"
 "Victim of This Town"
 "National Ant-Hum"

References 

The Two-Minute Miracles albums
2003 albums
Sequel albums